Václav Nelhýbel (September 24, 1919 – March 22, 1996) was a Czech American composer, mainly of works for student performers.

Life and career 
Nelhýbel was born the youngest of five children in Polanka, Czechoslovakia. He received his early musical training in Prague, going to both Charles University in Prague and Prague Conservatory.  In 1942 he went to Switzerland, where he studied at University of Fribourg; after 1947 he taught there.  In 1957 he came to the United States, where he taught at several schools, including Lowell State College. He served as Composer-in-Residence at University of Scranton for several years until his death. The University Department of Performance Music continues to house his full collection of works.

Some of his music is for wind instruments or concert band, and most of his published music is designed for student performers.  He used non-functional modal writing, pandiatonicism, and motor rhythms extensively.

Nelhýbel received numerous prizes and awards for his compositions, which include a prize at the International Music and Dance Festival in Copenhagen, Denmark, for his ballet "In the Shadow of the Limetree".  In 1954, he was also awarded the first prize of the Ravitch Foundation in New York for his opera "A Legend", and in 1978 he won an award from the Academy of Wind and Percussion Arts. Four American universities honored him with honorary doctoral degrees in music.

In addition to his works for winds, he wrote three ballets, three operas, and a symphony.

He was also a member of Phi Mu Alpha Sinfonia and Kappa Kappa Psi.

Works

Orchestra 
 1964 Etude symphonique
 1966 Passacaglia for Orchestra and Solo Piano
 1967 Dies ultima for Orchestra, SATB Chorus, SATB Soli, Narrator, Speaking Chorus and Jazz Band
 1967 Music for Orchestra
 1968 Movement for Orchestra
 1972 A mighty fortress
 1973 Polyphonies
 1974 Aegean Modes
 1976 Finale
 1977 Concerto spirituoso No. 4 for Orchestra, String Quartet and Solo Voice
 1976 Slavonic Triptych
 1979 Lincoln Scene
 1980 Six Fables for all time for Orchestra, SATB Chorus and Narrator
 1981 Overture for Orchestra
 1985 New Orleans Concerto
 Cantique des cantiques for Orchestra, Soprano Solo, Harp and Piano
 Cantus Concertante for Orchestra, Violin, Viola, Cello Soli and Soprano Solo
 Canzona e Toccata feroce
 Christmas in Bohemia for Mixed Choir and Orchestra
 Concerto spirituoso No. 5 for Orchestra, Saxophone Quartet and String Quartet
 Concerto for Clarinet and Orchestra
 Concerto for Double Bass and Orchestra
 Concerto for Guitar and Chamber Orchestra
 Concerto for Trombone and Orchestra
 Concerto for Viola and Orchestra
 Concertino for Chamber Orchestra and Piano
 Divertimento for Brass Quintet and Orchestra
 Fantasia Concertante
 Fantasy on America for Festival Orchestra, Solo Violin and Youth Solo Section
 Four Australian Songs for Orchestra and (SA) Chorus
 Four readings from Marlowe's "Doctor Faustus" for Orchestra (or Piano) and Male Solo Voice
 Graffiti Pompeiani for Orchestra, SSATTBB Soli and Piano
 Houston Concerto
 Jesu meine Freude
 Kindermarch
 Let there be Music for Orchestra, SATB Chorus, Baritone Voice Solo, Piano, Bass Guitar and Electric Guitar
 Music for Woodwind Quintet and Orchestra
 Praise the Lord for Orchestra, SATB Chorus, SATB Soli and Piano
 Rhapsody for Saxophone and Orchestra
 Rhapsody in D for Orchestra, String Quartet and Piano
 Sine Nomine for SATB Chorus, SATB Soloists, Orchestra and Band
 Sinfonie contra Plagam for Orchestra and SATB Chorus
 Sinfonietta Concertante
 Three Modes for Orchestra for Orchestra and Piano
 Two Movements for Chamber Orchestra

Concert band 
 1965 Chorale
 1965 Symphonic Requiem for Band and Bass Baritone Solo
 1965 Trittico
 Allegro maestoso
 Adagio
 Allegro marcato
 1966 Adagio and Allegro
 1966 Andante and Toccata
 1966 Appassionato
 1966 Estampie for Band and antiphonal Brass Choir (2 Trumpets, 2 Trombones)
 1966 Prelude and Fugue
 1966 Symphonic Movement
 1967 Caucasian Passacaglia
 1967 Ceremonial Music for Field Band and antiphonal Trumpet
 1967 Suite Concertante
 1967 Three Revolutionary Marches (composed by Semtana, arranged by Nehlýbel)
 1968 Festivo
 1969 Marcia Dorica
 1969 Suite from Bohemia
 1970 Two Symphonic Movements
 1970 Cantata Pacis SATB Chorus, SATB Soloists, Wind Ensemble, Piano-Celesta, Organ and Percussion
 1971 Yamaha Concerto
 1971 Hymn of Hope for Band and SATB Chorus
 1972 Alaska Scherzo
 1972 Antiphonale for Band, Brass Sextet (3 Trumpets, 3 Trombones)
 1972 High Plains
 1972 Introit for Band and Chimes Solo
 1973 Concert Piece for Band, Solo Wind Instrument (Alto or Tenor or Baritone Saxophone, or Trumpet, or Trombone, or Baritone, or Tuba)
 1973 Organum for Band and antiphonal Brass Choir (2 Trumpets, 2 Trombones)
 1974 Czech Suite
 1974 Dixie Parade
 1974 Halleluiah for Band and SATB Chorus
 1974 Russian Chant and Dance
 1975 Fugue to the Mountains
 1975 Praise to the Lord for Band and antiphonal Trumpets
 1976 Ballad
 1976 Ca Ira (Song of the French Revolution)
 1976 Corsican Litany
 1976 Crusaders
 1976 Dialogues for Band and Piano Solo
 1976 Evening Song
 1976 Fanfares (Smetana-Nelhybel)
 1976 Finale Based on When Johnny Comes Marching Home; Glory, Glory Hallelujah; and America
 1976 March in Counterpoint
 1976 March to nowhere
 1976 Parade
 1976 Processional
 1976 Religioso
 1976 Valse Nostalgique
 1977 Aegean Modes
 1977 Lyrical March
 1977 Yugoslav Dance
 1979 Amen
 1979 Ritual
 1980 Battle Hymn of the Republic for Band and SATB Chorus
 1981 Concerto Grosso for Band and Tubas Solo (2 or more Tubas)
 1981 He's got the whole World in his Hands for Band and SATB Chorus
 1981 Swing low, sweet Chariot for Band and SATB Chorus
 1982 Concertante
 1982 Fantasia Three interpretations of Prelude I from Johann Sebastian Bach's Well-Tempered Clavier
 1982 French Suite
 1982 Holiday in Germany
 1983 Born to die
 1983 Christmas in Poland
 1983 Great is thy Faithfulness (Runyan-Nelhybel) for Band and SATB Chorus
 1984 Agon
 1985 Overture for Band
 1988 Christmas March
 1988 Festove Adorations Based on A Mighty Fortress, Jesu Priceless Treasure, and Praise the Almighty
 1989 Cantus
 1992 Procession to the End of Time
 1995 Concertato for Tenor Trombone, Bass Trombone and Wind Ensemble
 1996 Concerto for Euphonium and Band
 1996 Prelude and Chorale for Band and Solo Instrument - Based on the 12th century chorale Svaty Vaclave
 1996 Prayer and Thanksgiving
 1996 Songs of Praise Based on God of our Fathers; Holy, Holy, Holy; Onward Christian Soldiers
 1996 Star Spangled Banner
 Agape for Soloists, SATB Chorus and Wind Ensemble
 Agitato e Marcia
 Amen for Everyman for SATB Chorus, SB Soloists, Band, Jazz Ensemble and Organ
 America sings for SATB Chorus and Band
 Benny Havens
 Canticum for Band and SATB Chorus
 Ceremony for Band
 Chorale Variations
 Chronos for Band, Guitar and Piano
 Grave - Adagio
 Toccata feroce
 Concerto for Bass Trombone and Band
 Concerto for Clarinet (or Saxophone), 25 Winds, Percussion
 Concerto for Horn (or Tuba), Piccolo, 2 Flutes, Oboe, English Horn, 2 Bassoons, 2 Clarinets, Harp, Double Bass, 2 Trumpets, Trombone, Vibraphone, Xylophone, Bells, Chimes
 Cornerstone for a new Moon for SATB, Band, Piano and Organ
 Dance of the dead Souls
 De Profundis Concerto for Trumpet and Band
 Divertimento for Band
 Drake Suite
 Epitaph
 Espressivo
 Five and a half Songs for SATB Chorus, TB Soloists, 12 Woodwinds, 5 Brass, 2 Percussion and Keyboard
 Golden Concerto for Trumpet, 16 Winds and Percussion
 Hymn of hope for (SATB) Chorus and Band
 Jesu, Priceless Treasure (Bach-Nelhybel) for Band and SATB Chorus
 La danse des fauves for Clarinet, Oboe/English Horn, Bassoon and Band
 Lento for Band
 Liturgy for Band and Solo Voice
 Monolith
 Musical Offering (Bach-Nelhybel) Based on three chorales by Johann Sebastian Bach: Jesu Priceless Treasure, Morning Star, Oh Sacred Head Now Wounded
 Ostinato
 Pentecost Concerto for Clarinet and Band
 Rhapsody in C for Band and Piano Solo
 Sand-Silence-Solitude
 Sine Nomine for SATB Chorus, SATB Soloists, Orchestra and Band
 Sinfonia Resurrectionis
 The Silence for Band and Soprano Solo
 Te Deum SATB Chorus, SATB Soloists, Organ or 3 Trumpets, 3 Trombones, Tuba and Timpani
 Toccata (Cernohorsky-Nelhybel) for Band and Organ - An arrangement of a toccata by Bohuslav Matej Cernohorsky (1684–1742)
 Toccata feroce for Band and Piano Solo
 Toccata in D
 Toccata in D (Flat)
 Toccata in E
 Variations on "Es ist genug"

Organ 
 Concerto No. 1 for Organ and Orchestra without Woodwinds
 Concerto No. 2 for Organ and Orchestra without Woodwinds
 Concerto No. 3 for Organ, Piccolo Trumpet and Timpani
 Introit for Organ and solo chimes

Choral 
 1966 Caroli Antiqui Varii SSATTBB Chorus - 7 traditional Christmas songs
 Quem vidistis
 Lully lulla
 Qui creavit caelum
 Celebrons
 O Jesu Christ
 Es kommt ein Schiff geladen
 Puer natus in Bethlehem
 1966 Epitaph for a Soldier SATB Chorus and SA Soloists - Text by Walt Whitman from Leaves of Grass
 1966 The Wife of Usher's well SATB Chorus
 1967 Four Ballads - (The Gallows -Tree) SSATBB Chorus and SBB Soloists
 1967 Four Ballads - (Come, O My Love) TBB Chorus
 1967 Four Ballads - (Peter Gray) SSA Chorus
 1967 Four Ballads - (The Devil and the Farmer's Wife) SSATBB Chorus
 1971 Let my People go SATB Chorus and SATB Soloists
 1972 The Lord shall raise me up SATB Chorus
 1973 Gift of Love SA Chorus
 1975 Estampie Natalis for eight-part mixed chorus, SAT soli, piccolo, violin (viola), cello, and percussion
 1977 Psalm 150 (Praise Him with the Timbrel) Four-Part Chorus of Mixed Voices
 1979 Adoratio 6 Sopranos, 5 Altos, 5 Tenors, 5 Basses (or larger Chorus) - Text from the Second Book of Solomon's Song of Songs
 1980 Orange and blue SATB Chorus
 1981 All through the Night SSA Chorus
 1981 Katy Cruel SSA Chorus
 Banana Three and other Songs SATB Chorus

Opera 
 1954 A Legend
 1979 Everyman - based on a medieval ballad
 King Lear - Text: William Shakespeare's King Lear
 The Station

Selected discography 
The Symphony Orchestra and Its Instruments (1959)
Twelve-Tone Composition Prepared by Vaclav Nelhybel (1961)
Forms in Instrumental Music: Prepared by Vaclav Nelhybel (1962)
Modal Counterpoint in the Style of the 16th Century Prepared by Vaclav Nelhybel (1962)
Music Arrangement: Prepared by Vaclav Nelhybel - Musical Examples Played by Chamber Orchestra (1962)
Traditional Harmony Prepared by Vaclav Nelhybel (1962)
The Fugue in the Style of the 18th Century (1964)
Tonal Counterpoint in the Style of the 18th Century Prepared by Vaclav Nelhybel (1964)
Outer Space: Music by Vaclav Nelhybel (1974)

References

External links 
 
Discography at Smithsonian Folkways
Interview with Vaclav Nelhybel, October 25, 1986

1919 births
1996 deaths
20th-century American composers
20th-century classical composers
American classical composers
American male classical composers
American opera composers
American people of Czech descent
Charles University alumni
Czech classical composers
Czech male classical composers
Czech opera composers
Czechoslovak emigrants to the United States
Male opera composers
People from Ridgefield, Connecticut
Place of death missing
University of Fribourg alumni
University of Scranton faculty
20th-century American male musicians